King George is an elevated station on the Expo Line of Metro Vancouver's SkyTrain rapid transit system. The station is located in the south end of the Surrey City Centre district of Surrey, British Columbia, Canada, and is one of the outbound termini of the Expo Line, the other being Production Way–University station. The station is located at the corner of King George Boulevard and 100 Avenue, just north of Fraser Highway.

The station is within walking distance to Holland Park and Surrey Memorial Hospital. A number of mixed-use developments continue to be built near the station, and the recent King George Hub development has displaced the park and ride facility that had once served the station.

History
King George station was opened in 1994 as part of the second extension of the Expo Line into Surrey; the other stations included on this extension were Gateway and Surrey Central. The station is named for nearby King George Boulevard, which in turn is named after King George VI, who visited the municipality of Surrey in 1939.

Since opening in 1994, it has served as an outbound terminus of the Expo Line. The tracks continue beyond the station for about a block before they terminate and are used to store extra cars and to allow outbound trains to switch tracks for their ensuing inbound runs; plans call for the line to be extended deeper into Surrey, following Fraser Highway.

In 2022, an Expo Line extension from King George station to 203 Street in Langley City was approved. Construction on the  extension was scheduled estimated to begin in 2024 and to be completed by 2028.

Station information

Station layout

Entrances
 East entrance: is accessible from Whalley Boulevard and includes a designated passenger drop-off area. Bus connections at this entrance serve Fleetwood, Langley and White Rock.
 West entrance: is located on King George Boulevard and provides access to bus routes serving Guildford, Newton, North Delta and White Rock.

Transit connections

King George station is a major connection point for the TransLink bus network for Delta, Langley, Surrey and White Rock.

References

Expo Line (SkyTrain) stations
Railway stations in Canada opened in 1994
Buildings and structures in Surrey, British Columbia
Transport in Surrey, British Columbia
1994 establishments in British Columbia